Oluf, Count of Rosenborg (Oluf Christian Carl Axel; 10 March 1923 – 19 December 1990), a former Danish prince, was the youngest child and son of Prince Harald of Denmark by his wife, Princess Helena Adelaide of Schleswig-Holstein-Sonderburg-Glücksburg.

Early life
Oluf is a Danish form of Olaf. Oluf renounced his rights to the throne in 1948 and took the title Count of Rosenborg when he married Annie Helene Dorrit Puggard-Müller (8 September 1926 - 14 May 2013) in Copenhagen on 4 February 1948. They had two children and divorced in 1977. He married secondly Lis Wolf-Jürgensen (b. 30 June 1935) in 1982, they divorced in 1983, without issue.

Oluf and his first wife had two children:
 Ulrik Harald Gunnar Oluf, Count of Rosenborg (b. 17 December 1950), married Tove Waigner Larsen (b. 14 December 1950) in Copenhagen on 4 April 1981. They have two children:
 Katharina Dorthea Helene, Countess of Rosenborg (b. 1 May 1981).
 Philip Oluf Axel Ulrik, Count of Rosenborg (b. 8 May 1986).
 Charlotte Helene Annie Dorrit, Countess of Rosenborg (b. 11 April 1953), married firstly Jens Philipsen on 12 November 1977. They divorced in 1978 without issue. She married secondly Torben Gyldenfeldt Wulff (b. 15 September 1954) at Lyngby on 11 April 1981. They have two children:
 Johan Henrik Oluf Torben Wulff (b. 17 July 1980).
 Beate Inge Dorrit Charlotte Wulff (b. 17 January 1983).

Ancestry

References

Citations

Bibliography

 

Danish princes
1923 births
1990 deaths
House of Glücksburg (Denmark)
Counts of Rosenborg
Nobility from Copenhagen
Disinherited European royalty
Recipients of the Cross of Honour of the Order of the Dannebrog
Burials at Roskilde Cathedral